Niko Beerenwinkel, Ph.D. (2004), is a German mathematician, who is active in the field of computational biology; he is an associate professor of the ETH Zurich since April 2013.

Awards 
 Otto Hahn Medal - Max Planck Society (2005);
 Emmy Noether Fellowship - German National Science Foundation.

References

Literature 
 Millionen-Segen für Basler Krebsforschung // Basler Zeitung - 18 December 2013.
 Niko Beerenwinkel erhält Otto-Hahn-Medaille // MEDICA Magazin - 2005.

Living people
German biologists
Academic staff of ETH Zurich
Year of birth missing (living people)